Riley Dixon (born August 24, 1993) is an American football punter who is a free agent. He was drafted by the Denver Broncos in the seventh round of the 2016 NFL Draft. He played college football at Syracuse.

Early years
Dixon attended and played high school football at Christian Brothers Academy in DeWitt, New York.

College career
Dixon attended and played college football at Syracuse.

Collegiate statistics

Professional career

Denver Broncos

Dixon was drafted by the Denver Broncos in the seventh round of the 2016 NFL Draft with the 228th overall pick. He was the second of three punters selected in the draft.

On May 11, 2016, the Broncos signed Dixon to a four-year, $2.42 million rookie contract, with a signing bonus of $80,009. Dixon won the punting job on August 30, 2016, when the Broncos released veteran Britton Colquitt. On December 11, 2016, Dixon threw a 16-yard pass on a fake punt, becoming the second Broncos punter to ever throw a pass after Chris Norman in 1986. In his rookie season, he punted 89 times for a 41.3 net average, the highest by a rookie in NFL history. He was named to the 2016 All-Rookie Team, the first Bronco since Chris Harris Jr. & Von Miller were both selected in 2011. In the 2017 season, he had 73 punts for 3,331 net yards for a 45.63 average.

New York Giants
On April 20, 2018, Dixon was traded to the New York Giants for a 2019 conditional seventh-round draft pick after the Broncos signed former Raiders punter Marquette King. In the 2018 season, he had 71 punts for 3,226	net yards for a 45.44 average.

On December 8, 2019, Dixon signed a three-year contract extension with the Giants.

On November 15, 2020, Dixon kicked a 71 yard punt in a game against the Eagles, the longest punt of his career. He was placed on the reserve/COVID-19 list by the Giants on November 18, 2020, and activated on November 23.

On December 21, 2021, the New York Giants restructured Dixon’s contract to create cap space.

On March 10, 2022, Dixon was released by the Giants.

Los Angeles Rams

On April 5, 2022, Dixon signed a one-year contract with the Los Angeles Rams.

NFL career statistics

References

External links
Syracuse Orange bio
Denver Broncos bio
New York Giants bio

Living people
1993 births
People from Oneida, New York
Players of American football from New York (state)
American football punters
Syracuse Orange football players
Denver Broncos players
New York Giants players
Los Angeles Rams players